The 11th Delaware General Assembly was a meeting of the legislative branch of the state government, consisting of the Delaware Legislative Council and the Delaware House of Assembly. Elections were held the first day of October and terms began on the twentieth day of October. The Assembly met in the state capital, Dover, convening October 20, 1786, in the first year of the administration of Delaware President Thomas Collins. 

The apportionment of seats was permanently assigned to three councilors and seven assemblymen for each of the three counties. Population of the county did not effect the number of delegates.

Leadership

Legislative Council
George Craighead, New Castle County

House of Assembly
John Cook, Kent County

Members

Legislative Council
Councilors were elected by the public for a three-year term, one third posted each year.

House of Assembly
Assemblymen were elected by the public for a one-year term.

References

Places with more information
Delaware Historical Society; website; 505 North Market Street, Wilmington, Delaware 19801; (302) 655-7161
University of Delaware; Library website; 181 South College Avenue, Newark, Delaware 19717; (302) 831-2965

1 011
1786 in Delaware
1787 in Delaware